Large is an English surname, with variants including Lardge and Lurge. Its meaning is variable, though it may derive from the Norman French adjective, large (meaning "generous" or "big" [as in, "that's big of you", meaning generous, as well as large in size]), as it is found in the surname "le Large" in English records dating back as far as the 13th century. Harrison's work on English surnames gives the following: "Large (adjectival: French, Latin) Big; Generous [Middle English Old French large; Latin larg-us, -a, [meaning] abundant, liberal]"

He gives an early citation for the name: Austin Belz from the Hundred Rolls, a reference dating to 1273.

He also provides a quotation showing the word in its older sense of generous, full, liberal or ample in its literary context:

So large of  [gift] and free was she (from Chaucer's Romance of the Rose I168)

Another variant surname, "de Large", appears to be continental European rather than English in origin.

Henry Brougham Guppy's survey circa 1881, based on local British directories, places Large as a surname local to North Wiltshire, and considers it to have particular prevalence among yeoman farmers.(Guppy, 1890)

According to the International Genealogical Index, the surname is also found in many other English counties; in Ireland, Scotland, Wales and other English language countries; in France and Germany, and, more rarely, in the Scandinavian countries. Large is also found in Latin America countries such as Colombia where all families surnamed Large are related.

People with the name Large, or one of its variants, include:

People

 Sir Andrew Large (born 1942), British, Monetary Policy Committee member
 Bonnie Large (born 1952), American, Playboy model
 Brian Large (born 1939), British opera video director
 Donald "Lofty" Large (born 1930), British soldier and author
 Eddie Large (1941–2020), British comedian
 Ernest Charles Large (1902–1976), English mycologist, phytopathologist, and novelist
 John Large, British engineer
 Josaphat-Robert Large (1942–2017), Haitian-American poet
 Rob Large (born 1981), English cricketer
 Robert Large (died 1441), English, Lord Mayor of London (1439–1440) and apprentice master of William Caxton, England's first printer
 Stephen Large, English musician
 Storm Large (born 1969), American singer
 Virginia Frederick Large  (1914–1982) American painter (Western and Impressionistic) who signed her paintings VFrederick Large
 Zach Large (born 1995), American college football player

Variants
 Robert C. De Large (1842–1874), American politician

References
 Carroll, Linda Largin, The Largin Legacy, 1995, p. 15 (date of reference to William le Large from the Hundred Rolls)
 Guppy, Henry Brougham. Homes of Family Names in Great Britain. London: Harrison, 1890. 
 International Genealogical Index, www.familysearch.org
 Harrison, Henry Surnames of the United Kingdom: A Concise Etymological Dictionary, 1912/1918, reprinted 1969 and 1996, p. 264
 Reidy, John; Kurath, Hans; Lewis, Robert E.; Kuhn, Sherman M., Middle English Dictionary, Language Arts & Disciplines, 1971, p. 663 (for instances of the surname) pp. 657–663 (for the adjectival and adverbial uses of the word)